Elachista alpinella is a moth of the family Elachistidae found in Europe and North America.

Description
The wingspan is  The head is fuscous, whitish-sprinkled. Forewings are dark fuscous, basal area in female sometimes pale ; a somewhat curved fascia before middle,
in male obsolete towards costa, an erect triangular tornal spot, and a similar spot on costa beyond it white, in female larger.Hindwings are dark grey.

The moth flies from June through to September.

The larvae feed on acute sedge (Carex acuta), lesser pond-sedge (Carex acutiformis), greater tussock-sedge (Carex paniculata) and  greater pond sedge (Carex riparia), mining the leaves of their host, The mine is narrow and begins just below the tip of the leaf and runs downwards. It might be found along the leaf margin or in the centre of the leaf. It is thought that the larvae start a new mine after hibernation. This mine is similar to the first, but ends near the leaf base. Pupation takes place outside of the mine.

Distribution
It is found from Fennoscandia and northern Russia to the Pyrenees and Italy and from Ireland to central Russia and Hungary. It is also found in North America.

References

alpinella
Leaf miners
Moths described in 1854
Moths of Europe
Moths of North America
Taxa named by Henry Tibbats Stainton